Ralph Edward Orrell (born February 7, 1965) is a Canadian politician. He represented the electoral district of Northside-Westmount in the Nova Scotia House of Assembly from June 2011 to July 2019 as a Progressive Conservative.

On June 21, 2011, Orrell was elected in a byelection for the electoral district of Cape Breton North. In the 2013 provincial election, Orrell was re-elected in the new riding of Northside-Westmount. He was re-elected in the 2017 election.

On May 10, 2019, Orrell announced he will seek the Conservative nomination in Sydney—Victoria for the 2019 federal election. On July 15, 2019, it was announced that Orrell was selected as the candidate. Orrell resigned his provincial seat on July 31, 2019.

Education
He graduated from Memorial Composite High School in 1983 and from Dalhousie University in 1987.

Electoral record

|-

|Progressive Conservative
|Eddie Orrell
|align="right"|4179
|align="right"|44.03
|align="right"|
|-

|Liberal
|John Higgins
|align="right"|3716
|align="right"|39.12
|align="right"|
|-

|New Democratic Party
|Cecil Snow
|align="right"|1597
|align="right"|16.82
|align="right"|
|}

|-
 
|Progressive Conservative
|Eddie Orrell
|align="right"|3975
|align="right"|54.88
|align="right"|
|-
 
|New Democratic Party
|Russell MacDonald
|align="right"|2265
|align="right"|31.27
|align="right"|
|-
 
|Liberal
|Brian McGean
|align="right"|931
|align="right"|12.85
|align="right"|
|-

|}

References

External links
Members of the Nova Scotia Legislative Assembly

1965 births
Canadian physiotherapists
Conservative Party of Canada candidates for the Canadian House of Commons
Progressive Conservative Association of Nova Scotia MLAs
People from North Sydney, Nova Scotia
People from Yarmouth, Nova Scotia
Living people
Dalhousie University alumni
21st-century Canadian politicians